Pattupalli is a village in Ponneri Taluk, Thiruvallur district in the Indian state of Tamil Nadu.

Demographics
Pattupalli had a population of 680. Males constitute 50% of the population and females 50%.

Pattupalli has an average literacy rate of 70%, higher than India's national average of 59.5%: male literacy is 85%, and female literacy is 60%. 20% of the population is under 6. Tamil is the official language.

Transport 

Pattupalli lies 10 km from National Highway 5 from Chennai to Calcutta.

Arul murugan Bus Transport provides transport.

Amenities 
Pattupalli lake is the biggest and cleanest lake among the 10 surrounding the village amidst a eucalyptus tree forest range.

A 300 year old banyan tree is located by achiyamman temple east of Pattupalli.

References

Villages in Tiruvallur district